Sarı Süleyman ("Süleyman the Blond") may refer to:

Sarı Süleyman Bey (fl. 1643)
Sarı Süleyman Pasha (fl. 1685–87), Grand Vizier